The indoor men's doubles was one of six lawn tennis events on the Tennis at the 1908 Summer Olympics programme. Nations could enter up to 6 pairs (12 players).

Draw

Finals

References

Sources
 
  ITF, 2008 Olympic Tennis Event Media Guide

1908
Men's indoor doubles
Men's events at the 1908 Summer Olympics